Kentucky Route 979 (KY 979) is an  state highway in Kentucky. KY 979's southern terminus is at KY 122 north-northeast of Buckingham, and the northern terminus is at KY 680 and KY 1426 in Harold

Major intersections

References

0979
Transportation in Floyd County, Kentucky